The 1956 United States presidential election in Illinois took place on November 6, 1956, as part of the 1956 United States presidential election. State voters chose 27 representatives, or electors, to the Electoral College, who voted for president and vice president.

Illinois was won by incumbent President Dwight D. Eisenhower (R–Pennsylvania), running with Vice President Richard Nixon, with 59.52% of the popular vote, against Adlai Stevenson (D–Illinois), running with Senator Estes Kefauver, with 40.29% of the popular vote.

Election information
The primaries and general elections coincided with those for other federal offices (Senate and House), as well as those for state offices.

Turnout
Turnout in the state-run primary elections (Democratic and Republican) was 31.69% with a total of 1,577,163 votes cast.

Turnout during the general election was 84.47%, with 4,407,407 votes cast.

Primaries
Both major parties held non-binding state-run preferential primaries on April 10.

Democratic

The 1956 Illinois Democratic presidential primary was held on April 10, 1956, in the U.S. state of Illinois as one of the Democratic Party's state primaries ahead of the 1956 presidential election.

The popular vote was a non-binding "beauty contest". Delegates were instead elected by direct votes by congressional district on delegate candidates.

All candidates besides Adlai Stevenson II, who won a landslide victory, were write-ins.

Republican

The 1956 Illinois Republican presidential primary was held on April 10, 1956, in the U.S. state of Illinois as one of the Republican Party's state primaries ahead of the 1956 presidential election.

The preference vote was a "beauty contest". Delegates were instead selected by direct-vote in each congressional districts on delegate candidates.

General election

Results by county

See also
 United States presidential elections in Illinois

Notes

References

Illinois
1956
1956 Illinois elections